The District Football Associations are the local governing bodies of association football in Finland. The 12 District FAs exist to govern all aspects of local football in their defined areas, providing grassroots support to the Finnish Football Association by promoting and administering football and futsal in their respective districts. The District FAs administer youth football and the lower tier leagues covering Kolmonen (Division 3) and the lower divisions.

The 12 district organisations are as follows:

Ålands Fotbollförbund
SPL Helsingin piiri 
SPL Itä-Suomen piiri
SPL Kaakkois-Suomen piiri
SPL Keski-Pohjanmaan piiri
SPL Keski-Suomen piiri
SPL Pohjois-Suomen piiri 
SPL Satakunnan piiri 
SPL Tampereen piiri 
SPL Turun piiri 
SPL Uudenmaan piiri 
SPL Vaasan piiri

There were also 12 district organisations that no longer exist having been absorbed into larger governing bodies.

SPL Hämeen-Satakunnan piiri
SPL Hämeen piiri
SPL Joensuun piiri
SPL Karjalan piiri 
SPL Keski-Uudenmaan piiri
SPL Kymenlaakson piiri
SPL Lahden piiri
SPL Lapin piiri
SPL Länsi-Uudenmaan piiri
SPL Oulun piiri
SPL Saimaan piiri
SPL Savon piiri

References

External links 
 Finnish Football Association (official website)

 
Football in Finland